Dino Perić (born 12 July 1994) is a Croatian professional footballer who currently plays as a centre-back for Dinamo Zagreb.

International career
He made his debut for Croatia on 16 November 2019, starting in a decisive home Euro 2020 qualifier against Slovakia and assisting Croatia's first goal in the 3–1 win that saw Croatia qualify for UEFA Euro 2020.

References

External links
 
 

1994 births
Living people
Sportspeople from Osijek
Association football central defenders
Croatian footballers
Croatia youth international footballers
Croatia under-21 international footballers
Croatia international footballers
NK Sesvete players
NK Lokomotiva Zagreb players
GNK Dinamo Zagreb players
First Football League (Croatia) players
Croatian Football League players